George James Guida (August 29, 1924September 7, 2015) was an American sprinter who competed in the 1948 Summer Olympics running the 400 meters.  He finished sixth in the final behind Arthur Wint's Olympic Record. Injured in the final, he did not run on the American 4x400 meters relay team that ultimately won the gold medal.  He was born in Philadelphia, Pennsylvania.  While running for Villanova University he was the 1947 Indoor National Champion at 600 yards.

Competition record

References

1924 births
2015 deaths
American male sprinters
Olympic track and field athletes of the United States
Athletes (track and field) at the 1948 Summer Olympics
Villanova Wildcats men's track and field athletes
Track and field athletes from Philadelphia